Jefferson Township is one of the twenty-two townships of Coshocton County, Ohio, United States. The 2010 census reported 1,500 people living in the township, 687 of whom were in the unincorporated portions.

Geography
Located in the northwestern part of the county, it borders the following townships:
Monroe Township - north
Clark Township - northeast corner
Bethlehem Township - east
Jackson Township - southeast corner
Bedford Township - south
Perry Township - southwest corner
Newcastle Township - west
Tiverton Township - northwest corner

Two villages are located in Jefferson Township: Nellie in the west, and Warsaw in the east.

Name and history
Jefferson Township was organized in 1826.

It is one of twenty-four Jefferson Townships statewide.

Government
The township is governed by a three-member board of trustees, who are elected in November of odd-numbered years to a four-year term beginning on the following January 1. Two are elected in the year after the presidential election and one is elected in the year before it. There is also an elected township fiscal officer, who serves a four-year term beginning on April 1 of the year after the election, which is held in November of the year before the presidential election. Vacancies in the fiscal officership or on the board of trustees are filled by the remaining trustees.

References

External links
County website

Townships in Coshocton County, Ohio
Townships in Ohio